According to the 2011 census, there were 3,447 ethnic Czechs in Poland, up from 386 in 2002.

Most of them reside in and around Zelów (81, in Łódź Voivodeship), in the Czech Corner  within the southwest portion of Kłodzko County (47, in Lower Silesian Voivodeship) and in the Polish sections of Cieszyn Silesia (61). Some live in Warsaw.

Prior to the outbreak of the Second World War, there was a larger population of Czechs living in Poland, especially in the region surrounding Zelów (forming a majority in the county) as well as in Wołyń Voivodeship (1.5%). After the war the Czechs of Wołyń were expelled by the Soviet Union, and forcibly resettled in Czechoslovakia.


Czechs in Poland and Poles of Czech Descent

See also  
 Czech Republic–Poland relations

References

External links 
 

Poland
Poland
Ethnic groups in Poland